Branislav Belić (or ; 10 March 1932 – 17 July 2016) was a Serbian politician. 

He was an Acting Mayor of Belgrade following the 2008 election. He served as an interim Chairman of the Assembly as the oldest member. Previously this seat, which is also a seat of the acting mayor, was held by Zoran Alimpić. Acting mayors were necessary in the period until the election of the new one, due to the death of the elected mayor Nenad Bogdanović. His term ended with election of Dragan Đilas.

He graduated from the University of Belgrade's Law School and has worked in the legal profession as well as foreign trade. He was an elected councilor and president of the Municipal Assembly of Savski Venac and councilor of the City of Belgrade in several terms, and he was a member of the National Assembly of Serbia and member of the Assembly of the State Union of Serbia and Montenegro.

He died on 17 July 2016 in Belgrade.

See also
 Mayor of Belgrade

References

External links 
 Branislav Belić, Chairman of the Assembly biography

1932 births
2016 deaths
Mayors of Belgrade
Members of the National Assembly (Serbia)
University of Belgrade Faculty of Law alumni
Democratic Party (Serbia) politicians